The 1983 Atlantic Coast Conference men's basketball tournament was held in Atlanta, Georgia, at the Omni Coliseum from March 11–13. NC State defeated Virginia, 81–78, to win the championship. Sidney Lowe of NC State was named MVP. It was the first time the event was held in Atlanta.

Bracket

References

Tournament
ACC men's basketball tournament
Basketball competitions in Atlanta
College sports in Georgia (U.S. state)
ACC men's basketball tournament
1980s in Atlanta
ACC men's basketball tournament